Barrios' War of Reunification was a war initiated by President Justo Rufino Barrios of Guatemala. His goal was to reunify Central America with himself as President. He died in battle on 2 April 1885 and peace was reached on 14 April.

Background 
The Federal Republic of Central America formed in 1821 after declaring independence from the First Mexican Empire. The First Central American Civil War solidified the nation's existence under Francisco Morazán from 1826 to 1829, but the Second Central American Civil War tore the country apart from 1838 to 1841. 

In April 1871, two Guatemalan Divisional Generals, Miguel García Granados and Justo Rufino Barrios, overthrew President Vicente Cerna y Cerna. García Granados replaced Cerna y Cerna as President, but he retired in 1873 and was succeeded by Barrios. He was a firm supporter of Central American reunification and he wanted to make himself President of a reunited Central America. He was inspired by Otto von Bismarck successfully uniting Germans under Prussia. He wished to do the same; unite Central Americans under Guatemala.

War

Declaration of unification 
On 28 February 1885, Barrios gave a speech where he declared himself President of Central America. He declared he had supreme authority over all the nations of Central America: Costa Rica, El Salvador, Guatemala, Honduras, and Nicaragua. The National Assembly of Guatemala held a session on 5 March and the legislature approved Barrios' declaration. Barrios believed all the other Central American nations would be enthusiastic to join Guatemala to recreate a Central American union, but instead, only Honduras accepted his declaration on 7 March. The other three nations, Costa Rica, El Salvador, and Nicaragua, all denounced the declaration and wished to remain independent.

Mexican involvement 
Barrios began mobilizing the Guatemalan Army on 10 March and began moving his soldiers to the Salvadoran border on 23 March. He threatened military force and thought that the threat of military action would make El Salvador submit, however, Salvadoran President Rafael Zaldívar began preparing his own army to defend against Barrios' invasion force. 

El Salvador called for assistance from Mexico to distract the Guatemalans while they prepared their army. President Porfirio Díaz mobilized an army of 15,000 soldiers along the Guatemalan border, and in response, Barrios had 1,500 soldiers stationed on the border under the command of Manuel Barillas to defend from a Mexican invasion. The Guatemalans attempted to negotiate with the Mexicans through the United States' ambassador to Guatemala, Antonio Batres Jáuregui. The negotiations succeeded and Díaz demobilized his soldiers, stating that the measures were for self-defense purposes.

Invasion of El Salvador 

On 31 March, Barrios marched his soldiers into Salvadoran territory and the first target to capture was the town of Chalchuapa. The Salvadorans defended the town with a garrison of 5,000 soldiers under the command of Adán Mora. The Guatemalans waged a battle from 1 to 2 April but the defensive forces stood their ground. Barrios was killed during the battle with reports claiming he was either shot in the heart by a Salvadoran soldier and fell off his horse or that he was shot in the back by a Guatemalan soldier who accidentally shot him.

After Barrios was killed, one of his military officers, Felipe Cruz, took command of the army. He attempted to keep waging battle, but due to falling morale, he had his forces retreat.

Peace 
Zaldívar attempted to seek peace but Cruz initially refused. Honduras and Nicaragua agreed to peace on 11 April while Guatemala, El Salvador, and Costa Rica came to peace on 14 April.

Aftermath 
After Barrios' death, Alejandro M. Sinibaldi became President of Guatemala, who was then succeeded by Barillas in 1886. Zaldívar was overthrown on 22 June by Francisco Menéndez. Costa Rican President Próspero Fernández Oreamuno died in office during the war and was succeeded by Bernardo Soto Alfaro.

See also 
 Battle of Chalchuapa

References 

Conflicts in 1885
Invasions
1880s in El Salvador
1880s in Guatemala
1880s in Costa Rica
1880s in Honduras
1880s in Mexico
1880s in Nicaragua
Wars involving El Salvador
Wars involving Guatemala
Wars involving Honduras
Wars involving Nicaragua
Wars involving Costa Rica
Wars involving Mexico